Z. grandis may refer to:
 Zaprionus grandis, a fruit fly species in the genus Zaprionus
 Zdenekia grandis, a prehistoric winged insect species from the Czech Republic
 Zeuxine grandis, an orchid species in the genus Zeuxine

See also
 Grandis (disambiguation)